In macroeconomics, the money supply (or money stock) refers to the total volume of currency held by the public at a particular point in time. There are several ways to define "money", but standard measures usually include currency in circulation (i.e. physical cash) and demand deposits (depositors' easily accessed assets on the books of financial institutions). The central bank of a country may use a definition of what constitutes legal tender for its purposes.

Money supply data is recorded and published, usually by a government agency or the central bank of the country. Public and private sector analysts monitor changes in the money supply because of the belief that such changes affect the price levels of securities, inflation, the exchange rates, and the business cycle.

The relationship between money and prices has historically been associated with the quantity theory of money. There is some empirical evidence of a direct relationship between the growth of the money supply and long-term price inflation, at least for rapid increases in the amount of money in the economy. For example, a country such as Zimbabwe which saw extremely rapid increases in its money supply also saw extremely rapid increases in prices (hyperinflation). This is one reason for the reliance on monetary policy as a means of controlling inflation.

Money creation by commercial banks

Commercial banks play a role in the process of money creation, under the fractional-reserve banking system used throughout the world. In this system,  credit is created whenever a bank gives out a new loan and destroyed when the borrower pays back the principal on the loan.

This new money, in net terms, makes up the non-M0 component in the M1-M3 statistics. In short, there are two types of money in a fractional-reserve banking system:

 central bank money — obligations of a central bank, including currency and central bank depository accounts
 commercial bank money — obligations of commercial banks, including checking accounts and savings accounts.

In the money supply statistics, central bank money is MB while the commercial bank money is divided up into the M1-M3 components. Generally, the types of commercial bank money that tend to be valued at lower amounts are classified in the narrow category of M1 while the types of commercial bank money that tend to exist in larger amounts are categorized in M2 and M3, with M3 having the largest.

In the United States, a bank's reserves consist of U.S. currency held by the bank (also known as "vault cash") plus the bank's balances in Federal Reserve accounts. For this purpose, cash on hand and balances in Federal Reserve ("Fed") accounts are interchangeable (both are obligations of the Fed). Reserves may come from any source, including the federal funds market, deposits by the public, and borrowing from the Fed itself.

Open market operations by central banks

Central banks can influence the money supply by open market operations. They can increase the money supply by purchasing government securities, such as government bonds or treasury bills. This increases the liquidity in the banking system by converting the illiquid securities of commercial banks into liquid deposits at the central bank. This also causes the price of such securities to rise due to the increased demand, and interest rates to fall. These funds become available to commercial banks for lending, and by the multiplier effect from fractional-reserve banking, loans and bank deposits go up by many times the initial injection of funds into the banking system.

In contrast, when the central bank "tightens" the money supply, it sells securities on the open market, drawing liquid funds out of the banking system. The prices of such securities fall as supply is increased, and interest rates rise. This also has a multiplier effect.

This kind of activity reduces or increases the supply of short term government debt in the hands of banks and the non-bank public, also lowering or raising interest rates. In parallel, it increases or reduces the supply of loanable funds (money) and thereby the ability of private banks to issue new money through issuing debt.

The simple connection between monetary policy and monetary aggregates such as M1 and M2 changed in the 1970s as the reserve requirements on deposits started to fall with the emergence of money funds, which require no reserves. At present, reserve requirements apply only to "transactions deposits" – essentially checking accounts. The vast majority of funding sources used by private banks to create loans are not limited by bank reserves. Most commercial and industrial loans are financed by issuing large denomination CDs. Money market deposits are largely used to lend to corporations who issue commercial paper. Consumer loans are also made using savings deposits, which are not subject to reserve requirements. This means that instead of the value of loans supplied responding passively to monetary policy, we often see it rising and falling with the demand for funds and the willingness of banks to lend.

Some economists argue that the money multiplier is a meaningless concept, because its relevance would require that the money supply be exogenous, i.e. determined by the monetary authorities via open market operations. If central banks usually target the shortest-term interest rate (as their policy instrument) then this leads to the money supply being endogenous.

Neither commercial nor consumer loans are any longer limited by bank reserves. Nor are they directly linked proportional to reserves. Between 1995 and 2008, the value of consumer loans has steadily increased out of proportion to bank reserves. Then, as part of the financial crisis, bank reserves rose dramatically as new loans shrank.

In recent years, some academic economists renowned for their work on the implications of rational expectations have argued that open market operations are irrelevant. These include Robert Lucas Jr., Thomas Sargent, Neil Wallace, Finn E. Kydland, Edward C. Prescott and Scott Freeman. Keynesian economists point to the ineffectiveness of open market operations in 2008 in the United States, when short-term interest rates went as low as they could go in nominal terms, so that no more monetary stimulus could occur. This zero bound problem has been called the liquidity trap or "pushing on a string" (the pusher being the central bank and the string being the real economy).

Empirical measures in the United States Federal Reserve System

See also European Central Bank for other approaches and a more global perspective.

Money is used as a medium of exchange, as a unit of account, and as a ready store of value. These different functions are associated with different empirical measures of the money supply. There is no single "correct" measure of the money supply. Instead, there are several measures, classified along a spectrum or continuum between narrow and broad monetary aggregates. Narrow measures include only the most liquid assets: those most easily used to spend (currency, checkable deposits). Broader measures add less liquid types of assets (certificates of deposit, etc.).

This continuum corresponds to the way that different types of money are more or less controlled by monetary policy. Narrow measures include those more directly affected and controlled by monetary policy, whereas broader measures are less closely related to monetary-policy actions. It is a matter of perennial debate as to whether narrower or broader versions of the money supply have a more predictable link to nominal GDP.

The different types of money are typically classified as "M"s. The "M"s usually range from M0 (narrowest) to M3 (broadest) but which "M"s are actually focused on in policy formulation depends on the country's central bank. The typical layout for each of the "M"s is as follows:

 : In some countries, such as the United Kingdom, M0 includes bank reserves, so M0 is referred to as the monetary base, or narrow money.
 MB: is referred to as the monetary base or total currency. This is the base from which other forms of money (like checking deposits, listed below) are created and is traditionally the most liquid measure of the money supply.
 M1: Bank reserves are not included in M1.
 M2: Represents M1 and "close substitutes" for M1. M2 is a broader classification of money than M1. M2 is a key economic indicator used to forecast inflation.
 M3: M2 plus large and long-term deposits. Since 2006, M3 is no longer published by the US central bank. However, there are still estimates produced by various private institutions.
 MZM: Money with zero maturity. It measures the supply of financial assets redeemable at par on demand. Velocity of MZM is historically a relatively accurate predictor of inflation.

The ratio of a pair of these measures, most often M2 / M0, is called the money multiplier.

Definitions of "money"

East Asia

Hong Kong SAR, China

In 1967, when sterling was devalued, the Hong Kong dollar's peg to the pound was increased from 1 shilling 3 pence (£1 = HK$16) to 1 shilling 4½ pence (£1 = HK$14.5455) although this did not entirely offset the devaluation of sterling relative to the US dollar (it went from US$1 = HK$5.71 to US$1 = HK$6.06). In 1972 the Hong Kong dollar was pegged to the US dollar at a rate of US$1 = HK$5.65. This was reduced to HK$5.085 in 1973. Between 1974 and 1983 the Hong Kong dollar floated. On October 17, 1983, the currency was pegged at a rate of US$1 = HK$7.80 through the currency board system.

As of May 18, 2005, in addition to the lower guaranteed limit, a new upper guaranteed limit was set for the [Hong Kong dollar at 7.75 to the American dollar. The lower limit was lowered from 7.80 to 7.85 (by 100 pips per week from May 23 to June 20, 2005). The Hong Kong Monetary Authority indicated that this move was to narrow the gap between the interest rates in Hong Kong and those of the United States. A further aim of allowing the Hong Kong dollar to trade in a range is to avoid the HK dollar being used as a proxy for speculative bets on a renminbi revaluation.

The Hong Kong Basic Law and the Sino-British Joint Declaration provides that Hong Kong retains full autonomy with respect to currency issuance. Currency in Hong Kong is issued by the government and three local banks under the supervision of the territory's de facto central bank, the Hong Kong Monetary Authority. Bank notes are printed by Hong Kong Note Printing.

A bank can issue a Hong Kong dollar only if it has the equivalent exchange in US dollars on deposit. The currency board system ensures that Hong Kong's entire monetary base is backed with US dollars at the linked exchange rate. The resources for the backing are kept in Hong Kong's exchange fund, which is among the largest official reserves in the world. Hong Kong also has huge deposits of US dollars, with official foreign currency reserves of 331.3 billion USD .

Japan

The Bank of Japan defines the monetary aggregates as:
 M1: cash currency in circulation, plus deposit money
 M2 + CDs: M1 plus quasi-money and CDs
 M3 + CDs: M2 + CDs plus deposits of post offices; other savings and deposits with financial institutions; and money trusts
 Broadly defined liquidity: M3 and CDs, plus money market, pecuniary trusts other than money trusts, investment trusts, bank debentures, commercial paper issued by financial institutions, repurchase agreements and securities lending with cash collateral, government bonds and foreign bonds

Europe

United Kingdom

There are just two official UK measures. M0 is referred to as the "wide monetary base" or "narrow money" and M4 is referred to as "broad money" or simply "the money supply".
 M0: Notes and coin in circulation plus banks' reserve balance with Bank of England. (When the bank introduced Money Market Reform in May 2006, the bank ceased publication of M0 and instead began publishing series for reserve balances at the Bank of England to accompany notes and coin in circulation.)
 M4: Cash outside banks (i.e. in circulation with the public and non-bank firms) plus private-sector retail bank and building society deposits plus private-sector wholesale bank and building society deposits and certificates of deposit. In 2010 the total money supply (M4) measure in the UK was £2.2 trillion while the actual notes and coins in circulation totalled only £47 billion, 2.1% of the actual money supply.

There are several different definitions of money supply to reflect the differing stores of money. Owing to the nature of bank deposits, especially time-restricted savings account deposits, M4 represents the most illiquid measure of money. M0, by contrast, is the most liquid measure of the money supply.

Eurozone

The European Central Bank's definition of euro area monetary aggregates:
 M1: Currency in circulation plus overnight deposits
 M2: M1 plus deposits with an agreed maturity up to two years plus deposits redeemable at a period of notice up to three months.
 M3: M2 plus repurchase agreements plus money market fund (MMF) shares/units, plus debt securities up to two years

North America

United States 

The United States Federal Reserve published data on three monetary aggregates until 2006, when it ceased publication of M3 data and only published data on M1 and M2. M1 consists of money commonly used for payment, basically currency in circulation and checking account balances; and M2 includes M1 plus balances that generally are similar to transaction accounts and that, for the most part, can be converted fairly readily to M1 with little or no loss of principal. The M2 measure is thought to be held primarily by households. Prior to its discontinuation, M3 comprised M2 plus certain accounts that are held by entities other than individuals and are issued by banks and thrift institutions to augment M2-type balances in meeting credit demands, as well as balances in money market mutual funds held by institutional investors. The aggregates have had different roles in monetary policy as their reliability as guides has changed. The principal components are:<ref name="paf">{{cite web|url=http://www.federalreserve.gov/pf/pf.htm |title=The Federal Reserve – Purposes and Functions |publisher=Federalreserve.gov |date=April 24, 2013 |access-date=December 11, 2013}}</ref>

 M0: The total of all physical currency including coinage. M0 = Federal Reserve Notes + US Notes + Coins. It is not relevant whether the currency is held inside or outside of the private banking system as reserves.
 MB: The total of all physical currency plus Federal Reserve Deposits (special deposits that only banks can have at the Fed). MB = Coins + US Notes + Federal Reserve Notes + Federal Reserve Deposits
 M1: The total amount of M0 (cash/coin) outside of the private banking system plus the amount of demand deposits, travelers checks and other checkable deposits + most savings accounts. 
 M2: M1 + money market accounts, retail money market mutual funds, and small denomination time deposits (certificates of deposit of under $100,000).
 MZM: 'Money Zero Maturity' is one of the most popular aggregates in use by the Fed because its velocity has historically been the most accurate predictor of inflation. It is M2 – time deposits + money market funds
 M3: M2 + all other CDs (large time deposits, institutional money market mutual fund balances), deposits of eurodollars and repurchase agreements.
 M4-: M3 + Commercial Paper
 M4: M4- + T-Bills (or M3 + Commercial Paper + T-Bills)
 L: The broadest measure of liquidity, that the Federal Reserve no longer tracks. L is very close to M4 + Bankers' Acceptance
 Money Multiplier: M1 / MB. As of December 3, 2015, it was 0.756. While a multiplier under one is historically an oddity, this is a reflection of the popularity of M2 over M1 and the massive amount of MB the government has created since 2008.

Prior to 2020, savings accounts were counted as M2 and not part of M1 as they were not considered "transaction accounts" by the Fed. (There was a limit of six transactions per cycle that could be carried out in a savings account without incurring a penalty.) On March 15, 2020, the Federal Reserve eliminated reserve requirements for all depository institutions and rendered the regulatory distinction between reservable "transaction accounts" and nonreservable "savings deposits" unnecessary. On April 24, 2020, the Board removed this regulatory distinction by deleting the six-per-month transfer limit on savings deposits.  From this point on, savings account deposits were included in M1.

Although the Treasury can and does hold cash and a special deposit account at the Fed (TGA account), these assets do not count in any of the aggregates. So in essence, money paid in taxes paid to the Federal Government (Treasury) is excluded from the money supply. To counter this, the government created the Treasury Tax and Loan (TT&L) program in which any receipts above a certain threshold are redeposited in private banks. The idea is that tax receipts won't decrease the amount of reserves in the banking system. The TT&L accounts, while demand deposits, do not count toward M1 or any other aggregate either.

When the Federal Reserve announced in 2005 that they would cease publishing M3 statistics in March 2006, they explained that M3 did not convey any additional information about economic activity compared to M2, and thus, "has not played a role in the monetary policy process for many years." Therefore, the costs to collect M3 data outweighed the benefits the data provided. Some politicians have spoken out against the Federal Reserve's decision to cease publishing M3 statistics and have urged the U.S. Congress to take steps requiring the Federal Reserve to do so. Congressman Ron Paul (R-TX) claimed that "M3 is the best description of how quickly the Fed is creating new money and credit. Common sense tells us that a government central bank creating new money out of thin air depreciates the value of each dollar in circulation." Modern Monetary Theory disagrees. It holds that money creation in a free-floating fiat currency regime such as the U.S. will not lead to significant inflation unless the economy is approaching full employment and full capacity. Some of the data used to calculate M3 are still collected and published on a regular basis. Current alternate sources of M3 data are available from the private sector.

As of April 2013, the monetary base was $3 trillion and M2, the broadest measure of money supply, was $10.5 trillion.

Oceania
Australia

The Reserve Bank of Australia defines the monetary aggregates as:
 M1: currency in circulation plus bank current deposits from the private non-bank sector
 M3: M1 plus all other bank deposits from the private non-bank sector, plus bank certificate of deposits, less inter-bank deposits
 Broad money: M3 plus borrowings from the private sector by NBFIs, less the latter's holdings of currency and bank deposits
 Money base: holdings of notes and coins by the private sector plus deposits of banks with the Reserve Bank of Australia (RBA) and other RBA liabilities to the private non-bank sector.

New Zealand

The Reserve Bank of New Zealand defines the monetary aggregates as:
 M1: notes and coins held by the public plus chequeable deposits, minus inter-institutional chequeable deposits, and minus central government deposits
 M2: M1 + all non-M1 call funding (call funding includes overnight money and funding on terms that can of right be broken without break penalties) minus inter-institutional non-M1 call funding
 M3: the broadest monetary aggregate. It represents all New Zealand dollar funding of M3 institutions and any Reserve Bank repos with non-M3 institutions. M3 consists of notes & coin held by the public plus NZ dollar funding minus inter-M3 institutional claims and minus central government deposits

South Asia
India

The Reserve Bank of India defines the monetary aggregates as:
 Reserve money (M0): Currency in circulation, plus bankers' deposits with the RBI and 'other' deposits with the RBI. Calculated from net RBI credit to the government plus RBI credit to the commercial sector, plus RBI's claims on banks and net foreign assets plus the government's currency liabilities to the public, less the RBI's net non-monetary liabilities. M0 outstanding was 30.297 trillion as on March 31, 2020.
 M1: Currency with the public plus deposit money of the public (demand deposits with the banking system and 'other' deposits with the RBI). M1 was 184 per cent of M0 in August 2017.
 M2: M1 plus savings deposits with post office savings banks. M2 was 879 per cent of M0 in August 2017.
 M3 (the broad concept of money supply): M1 plus time deposits with the banking system, made up of net bank credit to the government plus bank credit to the commercial sector, plus the net foreign exchange assets of the banking sector and the government's currency liabilities to the public, less the net non-monetary liabilities of the banking sector (other than time deposits). M3 was 555 per cent of M0 as on March 31, 2020(i.e. 167.99 trillion.)
 M4: M3 plus all deposits with post office savings banks (excluding National Savings Certificates).

Link with inflation

Monetary exchange equation
The money supply is important because it is linked to inflation by the equation of exchange  in an equation proposed by Irving Fisher in 1911:
 
where
  is the total dollars in the nation's money supply,
  is the number of times per year each dollar is spent (velocity of money),
  is the average price of all the goods and services sold during the year,
  is the quantity of assets, goods and services sold during the year.

In mathematical terms, this equation is an identity which is true by definition rather than describing economic behavior. That is, velocity is defined by the values of the other three variables. Some adherents of the quantity theory of money assume that the velocity of money is stable and predictable, being determined mostly by financial institutions.

Most macroeconomists replace the equation of exchange with equations for the demand for money which describe more regular and predictable economic behavior.  However, predictability (or the lack thereof) of the velocity of money is equivalent to predictability (or the lack thereof) of the demand for money (since in equilibrium real money demand is simply ). Either way, this unpredictability made policy-makers at the Federal Reserve rely less on the money supply in steering the U.S. economy. Instead, the policy focus has shifted to interest rates such as the fed funds rate.

In practice, macroeconomists almost always use real GDP to define , omitting the role of all transactions except for those involving newly produced goods and services (i.e., consumption goods, investment goods, government-purchased goods, and exports). But the original quantity theory of money did not follow this practice:  was the monetary value of all new transactions, whether of real goods and services or of paper assets.

The monetary value of assets, goods, and services sold during the year could be grossly estimated using nominal GDP back in the 1960s. This is not the case anymore because of the dramatic rise of the number of financial transactions relative to that of real transactions up until 2008.  That is, the total value of transactions (including purchases of paper assets) rose relative to nominal GDP (which excludes those purchases).

Ignoring the effects of monetary growth on real purchases and velocity, this suggests that the growth of the money supply may cause different kinds of inflation at different times. For example, rises in the U.S. money supplies between the 1970s and the present encouraged first a rise in the inflation rate for newly-produced goods and services ("inflation" as usually defined) in the 1970s and then asset-price inflation in later decades: it may have encouraged a stock market boom in the 1980s and 1990s and then, after 2001, a rise in home prices, i.e., the famous housing bubble. This story, of course, assumes that the amounts of money were the causes of these different types of inflation rather than being endogenous results of the economy's dynamics.

When home prices went down, the Federal Reserve kept its loose monetary policy and lowered interest rates; the attempt to slow price declines in one asset class, e.g. real estate, may well have caused prices in other asset classes to rise, e.g. commodities.

Rates of growth
In terms of percentage changes (to a close approximation, under low growth rates), the percentage change in a product, say , is equal to the sum of the percentage changes ). So, denoting all percentage changes as per unit of time,

This equation rearranged gives the basic inflation identity:

Inflation (%ΔP) is equal to the rate of money growth (%Δ), plus the change in velocity (%Δ), minus the rate of output growth (%Δ). So if in the long run the growth rate of velocity and the growth rate of real GDP are exogenous constants (the former being dictated by changes in payment institutions and the latter dictated by the growth in the economy’s productive capacity), then the monetary growth rate and the inflation rate differ from each other by a fixed constant.

As before, this equation is only useful if %Δ follows regular behavior. It also loses usefulness if the central bank lacks control over %Δ.

Arguments
Historically, in Europe, the main function of the central bank is to maintain low inflation. In the USA the focus is on both inflation and unemployment. These goals are sometimes in conflict (according to the Phillips curve). A central bank may attempt to do this by artificially influencing the demand for goods by increasing or decreasing the nation's money supply (relative to trend), which lowers or raises interest rates, which stimulates or restrains spending on goods and services.

An important debate among economists in the second half of the 20th century concerned the central bank's ability to predict how much money should be in circulation, given current employment rates and inflation rates.  Economists such as Milton Friedman believed that the central bank would always get it wrong, leading to wider swings in the economy than if it were just left alone. This is why they advocated a non-interventionist approach: one of targeting a pre-specified path for the money supply independent of current economic conditions, even though in practice this might involve regular intervention with open market operations (or other monetary-policy tools) to keep the money supply on target.

The former Chairman of the US Federal Reserve, Ben Bernanke, suggested in 2004 that over the preceding 10 to 15 years, many modern central banks became relatively adept at manipulation of the money supply, leading to a smoother business cycle, with recessions tending to be smaller and less frequent than in earlier decades, a phenomenon termed "The Great Moderation" This theory encountered criticism during the global financial crisis of 2008–2009. Furthermore, it may be that the functions of the central bank need to encompass more than the shifting up or down of interest rates or bank reserves: these tools, although valuable, may not in fact moderate the volatility of money supply (or its velocity).

Impact of digital currencies and possible transition to a cashless society

See also

 A Program for Monetary Reform''
 American Monetary Institute
 Bank regulation
 Capital requirement
 Central bank
 Chartalism
 Chicago plan
 The Chicago Plan Revisited
 Committee on Monetary and Economic Reform
 Core inflation
 Debt levels and flows
 Economics terminology that differs from common usage
 Fiat currency
 Financial capital
 Float
 Fractional-reserve banking
 FRED (Federal Reserve Economic Data)
 Full reserve banking
 Great Contraction
 Index of Leading Indicators – money supply is a component
 Inflation
 Monetarism
 Monetary base
 Monetary economics
 Monetary reform
 Money circulation
 Money creation
 Money market
 Money demand
 Liquidity preference
 Seigniorage
 Stagflation

References

Further reading
 Article in the New Palgrave on Money Supply by Milton Friedman
 Do all banks hold reserves, and, if so, where do they hold them? (11/2001)
 What effect does a change in the reserve requirement have on the money supply? (08/2001)
 St. Louis Fed: Monetary Aggregates
 
 Discontinuance of M3 Publication
 Investopedia: Money Zero Maturity (MZM)

External links
 Aggregate Reserves Of Depository Institutions And The Monetary Base (H.3)
 Historical H.3 releases
 Money Stock Measures (H.6)
 U.S. MZM magnitude and velocity, used as a predictor of inflation
 Data on Monetary Aggregates in Australia
 Monetary Statistics on Hong Kong Monetary Authority
 Monetary Survey from People's Bank of China

Monetary policy
Inflation